In Dreams is the debut album by Joseph McManners and it was released on 5 December 2005 by Sony BMG following a £2 million 4-album record deal. The album features covers of mostly solo renditions of classical songs but it also features a duet with Jo Appleby.
 It was mostly well received by critics.

Background
The album, produced by Nick Patrick, is a collection of songs McManners particularly likes or ones that have special meaning to him. For example, the songs "Bright Eyes" and "Walking in the Air" were included because of their sentimental value. They remind him of how he used to watch Watership Down and how he used to watch The Snowman each Christmas Day with his mother. "Where is Love" and "The Little Prince Song" are important because they were key elements to the start of his career.

About the name of the album McManners said:

The album was recorded in Prague in the Czech Republic and the music was provided by the Prague Philharmonic Orchestra.

Critical recognition
The album received a nomination for "Album of the Year" at the 2006 Classical Brit Awards and McManners' rendition of "Bright Eyes" from the album has debuted at "number one" in Asian airplay, ahead of James Blunt and Prince.

Track listing

Information was retrieved from McManners' official website.

References

2005 debut albums
Sony BMG albums
Joseph McManners albums